Philippson is a patronymic surname meaning "son of Philipp", coming from the German language given name variant of "Philip", both derived from philippos, of  Ancient Greek origin (prefix philein, meaning "to love"; suffix hippos, meaning "horses"; combined, becoming "lover of horses"). 

"Philipp" evolved into "Philippson", a German surname especially prevalent amongst German Jews and Dutch Jews, often shortened back to Phillips. 

"Phillip" evolved into "Phillipson", an English and Welsh surname. Philippson or Phillipson may refer to:

Alfred Philippson (1864–1953), German geologist and geographer
Antony Phillipson (born 1971), British High Commissioner to Singapore
A. T. Phillipson (1910–1977), British vet and psychologist 
Bridget Phillipson (born 1983), British politician
Caspar Phillipson (born 1971), Danish actor
Coleman Phillipson (1878–1958), English legal scholar and historian
David Phillipson (born 1942), British archaeologist
Eddie Phillipson (1910–1991), English cricketer
Frank Phillipson (active 1934), English athlete
Heather Phillipson (born 1978), British artist
John Phillipson (1698–1756), British navy administrator and politician
Ludwig Philippson (1811–1889), German rabbi and author
Paul Phillipson (born 1952), Indian-born English cricketer
Richard Burton Phillipson (c. 1723–1792), British soldier and politician
Robert Phillipson (born 1942), English-born Danish professor and author
Tom Phillipson (1898–1965), English footballer

See also
Philipson

References

Patronymic surnames
Surnames from given names